was a Japanese photographer with United Press International who received the 1966 Pulitzer Prize for Photography for his combat photography of the Vietnam War during 1965. Two of these photographs were selected as "World Press Photos of the Year" in 1965 and 1966.  The 1965 photograph shows a Vietnamese mother and children wading across a river to escape a US bombing. 

The famous 1966 photograph shows U.S soldiers of the 1st Infantry division dragging a dead Viet Cong fighter to a burial site behind their M113 armored personnel carrier, after he was killed in a fierce night attack by several Viet Cong battalions against Australian forces during the Battle of Long Tan on 18 August 1966.

He also documented the Battle of Hue in 1968, for example capturing an image of Lance Corporal Don Hammons immediately after being wounded by enemy fire; he died minutes later.

On October 28, 1970, Sawada and Frank Frosch, UPI Phnom Penh branch chief, were ambushed by unknown assailants and assassinated while returning to Phnom Penh by car from a news-gathering outing to Takéo Province. The bodies of the two men were found abandoned in a rice paddy near the road, riddled with bullet holes. No blood or bullet holes were found in their car, suggesting that they had been dragged from their vehicle and killed execution-style. There was no chance they had been mistaken for soldiers since they were driving in a civilian car and were wearing brightly colored civilian clothing.

Notes

1936 births
1970 deaths
Assassinated Japanese journalists
Japanese photojournalists
Male murder victims
People from Aomori (city)
Pulitzer Prize for Photography winners
Japan–South Vietnam relations
War photographers killed while covering the Vietnam War